Akata Formation is part of the Tertiary Niger Delta (Akata-Agbada) petroleum system located in the Niger Delta Province, of Nigeria at the Gulf of Guinea, Atlantic Ocean.

The upper Akata Formation is cited to be a primary source rock, providing Type II/III kerogen, and a potential target in deep water offshore and possibly beneath currently producing intervals onshore. The clays are typically over-pressured due to the absence of enough porous sediments during compaction and are about 9,000 feet vertical depth below mean sea level.

The Agbada Formation has intervals that contain organic-carbon contents sufficient to be considered good source rocks.  The intervals, however, rarely reach thickness sufficient to produce a world-classoil province and are immature in various parts of the delta.  The Akata shale is present in large volumes beneath the Agbada Formation  and is at least volumetrically sufficient to generate enough oil for a world class oil province such as the Niger Delta. Based on organic-matter content and type.

References

Bibliography

External links 
 usgs.gov coverage

Geologic formations of Nigeria
Eocene Series of Africa
Neogene System of Africa
Shale formations
Source rock formations